Radim Zohorna (born 29 April 1996) is a Czech professional ice hockey player for the Toronto Marlies of the American Hockey League (AHL) while under contract with the Toronto Maple Leafs of the National Hockey League (NHL).

Playing career
Zohorna made his Czech Extraliga debut playing with HC Kometa Brno during the 2014–15 Czech Extraliga season.

Following his sixth season in the ELH in 2019–20, having set a career high with 10 goals, 12 assists and 22 points in 56 games with third-placed BK Mladá Boleslav, Zohorna was signed to a one-year, two-way contract with the Pittsburgh Penguins on 30 April 2020.

On 10 August 2020, Zohorna agreed to return to former Czech club BK Mladá Boleslav on loan until the commencement of the delayed 2020–21 North American season.

Zohorna made his NHL debut for Pittsburgh on 25 March 2021 against the Buffalo Sabres. He scored his first NHL goal on his first shot in that game.

On 2 October 2022, Zohorna was placed on waivers for the purpose to be sent down to the Wilkes-Barre/Scranton Penguins of the AHL for the 2022–23 season. However he was claimed the next day by the Calgary Flames.

On 3 March 2023, the Flames traded Zohorna to the Toronto Maple Leafs in exchange for Dryden Hunt.

Personal life
He has two brothers, Tomáš (Amur Khabarovsk, KHL) and Hynek (Lahti Pelicans, Liiga).

Career statistics

References

External links

1996 births
Living people
BK Mladá Boleslav players
Calgary Flames players
Calgary Wranglers players
Czech ice hockey forwards
HC Kometa Brno players
Pittsburgh Penguins players
SK Horácká Slavia Třebíč players
Sportspeople from Havlíčkův Brod
Toronto Marlies players
Undrafted National Hockey League players
Wilkes-Barre/Scranton Penguins players
Czech expatriate ice hockey players in the United States
Czech expatriate ice hockey players in Canada